Extreme Spirituals is a collaborative studio album by the group Birdsongs of the Mesozoic and vocalist Oral Moses, released on September 19, 2006 by Cuneiform Records. The album consists of 19th Century Negro spiritual songs re-arranged in the experimental rock/classical style of the Boston-based Birdsongs of the Mesozoic.

Track listing

Personnel 
Adapted from Extreme Spirituals liner notes.

Musicians
 Michael Bierylo – guitar, sampler, programming, recording
 Ken Field – saxophone, flute, percussion
 Erik Lindgren – grand piano, recording
 Oral Moses – vocals
 Rick Scott – synthesizer
Additional musicians
 Larry Dersch – drums (3, 8, 9)
 Terry Donahue – congas (1)
 Jason N. Marchionna – percussion (2, 5, 12)
 Ken Winokur – djembe (1)

Production and additional personnel
 Birdsongs of the Mesozoic – production
 Rich Durkee – mixing
 Diane Menyuk – design
 Chuck Sokol – assistant engineer
 Margaret Wiegel – photography
 Jonathan Wyner – mastering

Release history

References

External links 
 Extreme Spirituals at Discogs (list of releases)
 Extreme Spirituals at Bandcamp

2006 albums
Collaborative albums
Birdsongs of the Mesozoic albums
Cuneiform Records albums